Charles-Robert Ageron (6 November 1923 – 3 September 2008) was a French historian specializing in colonial Algeria. He was born on November 6, 1923 in Lyon and died on September 3, 2008 in Kremlin-Bicêtre.

Education and career
Born in Lyon, teacher of history, he taught at the Gautier high school in Algiers from 1947, then at the Lakanal high school in Sceaux from 1957. He was a research associate at CNRS from 1959 to 1961. He became assistant and then associate professor at the Sorbonne University, where he taught until 1969. At the same time in 1968, led by Charles-André Julien, he presented his thesis on the situation of Muslims in Algeria and France from 1871 to 1919.

He was appointed professor at the University of Tours in 1970, then at the Université Paris XII in 1982. He chaired the Société française d'histoire d'outre-mer (French Society of overseas history) up to 2008 and directed the Revue française d'histoire d'outre-mer (French magazine of overseas history).

Publications
 Politiques coloniales au Maghreb, ( Colonial politics in Maghreb), PUF, 1973
 Histoire de l'Algérie contemporaine (1871-1954), (History of Contemporary Algeria (1871.1954)), PUF, 1979
 Histoire de la France coloniale, ( History of colonial France colonial), Armand Colin, 1990
 La Argelia de los franceses, ( The Algeria of the French), Seoul, 1993

See also
 Colonial exhibition

External links
  L'hommage de Benjamin Stora à Charles-Robert Ageron sur le site www.mediapart.fr (Tribute to C.R. Aragon by Benjamin Stora).

Writers from Lyon
1923 births
2008 deaths
French male non-fiction writers
20th-century French historians
Lycée Lakanal teachers
20th-century French male writers
French people of colonial Algeria